The Connemara International Marathon, known as the Connemarathon, is a marathon in Connemara, County Galway, Ireland.

Comprising a road half marathon, a full marathon and a 39.3 mile ultramarathon, it usually takes place in April each year. 

The ultramarathon was added to the event schedule in 2004 and is 63.58 km long with total ascent of 146.49 m and has a maximum elevation of 99.64 m.

References

External links

Connemarathon Ultra, mapmyrun.com

Marathons in Europe
Recurring sporting events established in 2002
Athletics in the Republic of Ireland
Spring (season) events in the Republic of Ireland
Ultramarathons